Fernando Verdasco defeated Robin Söderling in the final, 6–3, 4–6, 6–3, to claim his first Barcelona Open title.

Rafael Nadal was the five-time defending champion, but withdrew from the tournament due to fatigue.

Seeds
The top eight seeds receive a bye into the second round.

Draw

Finals

Top half

Section 1

Section 2

Bottom half

Section 3

Section 4

Qualifying

Seeds

Qualifiers

Lucky loser

Draw

First qualifier

Second qualifier

Third qualifier

Fourth qualifier

Fifth qualifier

Sixth qualifier

Seventh qualifier

References
Main Draw
Qualifying Draw

Sing